This is a list of galleries, libraries, archives and museums in the State of Goa, India.

Galleries
Archaeological Museum and Portrait Gallery, Old Goa
Institute Menezes Braganza/Instituto Vasco da Gama, Panjim
Kala Academy, Panjim
Sunaparanta, Goa Centre for the Arts

Libraries
Bookworm Children's Library, Taleigao
Dr Francisco Luis Gomes District Library, Navelim
Goa State Central Library
Goa University Library, Taleigao
Goa Chambers of Commerce and Industry Library, Near Azad Maidan, Panjim
Goa Engineering College Library, Farmagudi, Ponda
Goa Legislative Assembly Library, Alto-Porvorim
Gomantak Marathi Academy, Porvorim
Institute Menezes Braganza Library, Panjim
Kala Academy Library, Panjim

Archives
Xavier Centre of Historical Research, Alto Porvorim
Archdiocese of Goa, Altinho, Panjim/Panaji

Museums
Archaeological Museum and Portrait Gallery, Old Goa
Ashvek Vintage World, Nuvem
Big Foot Museum, Loutolim
Goa Chitra Museum, Benaulim
Goa Science Centre, Panaji
Goa State Museum, Panaji
Museum of Christian Art, Old Goa
Museum of Goa, Pilerne
Naval Aviation Museum (India), Vasco da Gama

References

External links
Report of launch of GLAM project in Goa
Audio recording of the launch of the GLAM project in Goa

Galleries, Libraries, Museums and Archives
Galleries, Libraries, Museums and Archives in Goa
Galleries, Libraries, Museums and Archives
Goa
Galleries, Libraries, Museums and Archives
 Galleries, Libraries, Museums and Archives
Lists of tourist attractions in Goa